Ra Paulette is an American cave sculptor based in New Mexico who digs into hillsides to sculpt elaborate artistic spaces inside mountains. Since he began sculpting in 1990, he has dug over a dozen caves in New Mexico.

Reviewer Martha Mendoza in the Los Angeles Times described the caves he created as shrines, as hallowed places, a "sanctuary for prayer and meditation" while others describe the caves as works of art. The caves are finished with "scallops, molded curves, smooth ledges, inlaid stones, narrow pods and crusty ledges." His caves attract visitors worldwide.

Paulette is self-taught; he never studied architecture, sculpting or structural engineering in a formal school. He works with hand tools only, such as shovels, pick axes, and scrapers. According to one source, he requested to be paid only $12 per hour for his labour for one of his caves. Paulette grew up in northwest Indiana along the shores of Lake Michigan.
 
Paulette created Windows of the Earth Shrine in northern New Mexico for a resort north of Santa Fe.  The current resort and retreat center, Origin at Rancho de San Juan, provides the public with the opportunity to view and visit the cave sanctuary on guided, docent led tours, by appointment. Day visitors and overnight guests can hike a third of a mile, enjoy the view, and step inside the sandstone cave space to meditate, journal, enjoy the art, experience a sound bath with crystal singing bowls, or even hold a wedding photo shoot. "The current owner is passionate about preserving and maintaining this treasure for many generations to come....The original resort owners commissioned an artist, Ra Paulette, to open the interior of the natural butte...." The shrine took Paulette two and a half years to complete. Paulette's sculpture was the subject of an Academy Award-nominated 2014 documentary entitled Cavedigger, directed by Jeffrey Karoff.

In 2014, Paulette described his artistic approach:

See also
 Cavedigger, an Academy Award-nominated documentary about Paulette's sculpture

References

External links
 Cave photos
 Interactive virtual tour of two caves

Living people
Architects from New Mexico
Sculptors from New Mexico
Sculptors from Indiana
1940 births